KRI Teluk Kendari (518) is the first  of the Indonesian Navy.

Characteristics
She has a capacity of 478 passengers, including her crew of 109 and a helicopter crew of 6, in addition to ten Leopard main battle tanks or ten BMP-3F infantry fighting vehicles and one PT-76 amphibious tank. Teluk Kendari also has a helipad with hangar and capable of carrying a Bell 412 helicopter.

Service history
KRI Teluk Kendari was built by an Indonesian state-owned shipbuilder PT Dok & Perkapalan Kodja Bahari (Persero), Jakarta. The ship was ordered in 2012, based on AT-117M design that would become the Teluk Bintuni-class ships. Her building process was ceremonially begun with the first steel-cutting on 31 July 2012, and she was assigned with yard number of AT-1.

She was launched and officially named on 26 September 2014. She was planned to be the first ship in her class, but due of internal problems faced by the shipbuilder, her construction was delayed and the third ship of the class was completed first instead. She was transferred to the Navy and commissioned on 7 December 2020, with Sea Lieutenant Colonel Erpandrio Trio as her first commanding officer. She was assigned to Eastern Fleet Command, based at Surabaya.

References

2014 ships
Teluk Bintuni-class tank landing ships
Amphibious warfare vessels of the Indonesian Navy